Mazagh-e Kurian (also Romanized as Māzagh-e Kūrīān) is a village in Senderk Rural District, Senderk District, Minab County, Hormozgan Province, Iran. At the 2006 census, its population was 208, in 44 families.

References 

Populated places in Minab County